Portokalópita (in Greek, Πορτοκαλόπιτα; from πορτοκάλι portokáli "orange" and πιτα pita "cake") is a typical Greek cake whose main ingredient is sweet orange. Portokalópita is very popular in Greece and is usually consumed as a dessert with coffee. Within Greek pastries, it belongs to the family of cakes called siropiasta, sweets that are bathed in syrup, such as baklava. Although it has a sponge-like appearance, its dough is actually made from dry shreds of filo dough. (φύλλο phyllo), to which a mixture of Greek yogurt, egg and orange juice is added. Then is bathed on top with a syrup (liquid sugar) that has been simmered with oranges and sometimes flavored with vanilla and / or cinnamon. Ideally, it is consumed the next day or the day after, when the syrup is fully absorbed and all the flavors of the cake have been integrated. The mouthfeel should be fluffy and juicy, preventing it from being compact.

Orange is a staple ingredient of Greek cuisine and is grown in the south of the Peloponnese peninsula (especially in the areas of Laconia and Argolis) and Arta (in the north of the country) and on the island of Chios, between others.

See also 

 Galaktoboureko, another Greek filo pastry
 Patsavouropita, another Greek filo pastry

References 

Greek pastries